Marko Šakić (born April 13, 1994) is a Croatian ice hockey forward. He played with KHL Medveščak of the Kontinental Hockey League (KHL) during the 2013–14 KHL season.

References

External links

1994 births
Croatian ice hockey centres
KHL Medveščak Zagreb players
Living people